, nicknamed AT,  is a current professional basketball assistant coach for Osaka Evessa in Japan.   He was selected by the Niigata Albirex BB with the fifth overall pick in the 2008 bj League draft. He shortened his career due to a torn ACL in his left knee in 2015.

Career statistics

Regular season 

|-
| align="left" | 2007-08
| align="left" | Fukuoka
|20||0||17.7||44.6||41.5||81.3||0.4||2.1||0.9||0||8.1
|-
| align="left" | 2008-09
| align="left" | Niigata
|52||20||25.2||39.7||style="background-color:#CFECEC;| 41.3||89.4||1.1||3.2||1||0||13
|-
| align="left" | 2009-10
| align="left" | Niigata
|51||33||23.0||35.2||26.9||85.5||1.3||2.9||0.1||0.1||8.6
|-
| align="left" |2010-11
| align="left" | Fukuoka
|50||43||32.0||43.6 ||style="background-color:#CFECEC;| 46.0||81.3||1.7||3.7||1.2||0.1||10.2
|-
| align="left" | 2011-12
| align="left" | Fukuoka
|47||43||32.1||38.4 ||35.5 ||79.1 ||1.8||2.9||1||0.1||11
|-
| align="left" | 2012-13
| align="left" | Fukuoka
|49||47||29.2||40.8 ||31.7 ||86.9 ||1.5||3.4||0.9||0.1||9.8
|-
| align="left" | 2013-14
| align="left" | Fukuoka
|51||48||22.4|| 39.3 || 35.2 || 91.2 ||1.2||2.6||0.9||0.1||7.6
|-
| align="left" |2014-15
| align="left" |Akita
| 35 || 35 || 26.1 || 44.4 || 42.0 || 93.0 || 2.2 || 4.3 || 0.7 || 0.1 ||  9.7 
|-
| align="left" | 2015-16
| align="left" | Akita
| 20 || 20 || 19.4 || 31.9 || 37.3 || 72.0 || 1.6 || 2.9 || 0.6 || 0.0 ||  5.5
|-
| align="left" | 2016-17
| align="left" | Nishinomiya
| 24 ||19  || 25.0 ||38.7  ||37.0  ||81.1  || 2.4 ||3.1  || 0.7 || 0.0 || 7.9
|-
|- class="sortbottom"
! style="text-align:center;" colspan=2| Career 
!399||||26.1||39.8%||37.2%||85.4%||1.5||3.2||0.9||0.1||9.5 
|-

Playoffs 

|-
|style="text-align:left;"|2010-11
|style="text-align:left;"|Fukuoka
| 4 ||  || 37.3 || .415 || .267 || 1.000 || 2.8 || 4.0 || 2.8 || 0.0 || 12.0
|-
|style="text-align:left;"|2011-12
|style="text-align:left;"|Fukuoka 
| 2 ||  || 27.5 || .111 || .111 || .000 || 0.0 || 1.0 || 1.0 || 0.0 || 2.5
|-

References

1985 births
Living people
Akita Northern Happinets players
Japanese basketball coaches
Niigata Albirex BB players
Nishinomiya Storks players
Osaka Evessa coaches
Rizing Zephyr Fukuoka players
Sportspeople from Fukuoka Prefecture